Alan John Clarke (28 October 1935 – 24 July 1990) was an English television and film director, producer and writer.

Life and career
Clarke was born in Wallasey, Wirral, England.

Most of Clarke's output was for television rather than cinema, including work for the famous play strands The Wednesday Play and Play for Today. His subject matter tended towards social realism, with deprived or oppressed communities as a frequent setting.

As Dave Rolinson's book details, between 1962 and 1966 Clarke directed several plays at The Questors Theatre in Ealing, London. Between 1967 and 1969 he directed various ITV productions including plays by Alun Owen (Shelter, George's Room, Stella, Thief, Gareth), Edna O'Brien (Which of These Two Ladies Is He Married To? and Nothing's Ever Over) and Roy Minton (The Gentleman Caller, Goodnight Albert, Stand By Your Screen). He also worked on the series The Informer, The Gold Robbers and A Man of Our Times (but not, as Sight and Sound once claimed, Big Breadwinner Hog). 

Clarke continued to work for ITV through the 1970s but during the decade made much of his work for the BBC. This included pieces for The Wednesday Play (Sovereign's Company 1970), Play for Today and Play of the Month (The Love-Girl and the Innocent, 1973 and Danton's Death, 1978). Distinctive work for these strands included further plays by Minton including Funny Farm (1975) and Scum (further details below), but also Sovereign's Company (1970) by Don Shaw, The Hallelujah Handshake (1970) by Colin Welland and Penda's Fen (1974) by David Rudkin. He also made To Encourage the Others (1972), a powerful drama documentary about the Derek Bentley case, the case which was later dramatised in the 1991 film  Let Him Have It  by Peter Medak, and several documentaries, including Vodka Cola (1981) on multinational corporations. Clarke's other work in the mid-to-late 1970s included the initially unreleased documentary Bukovsky about the Soviet dissident and defector Vladimir Bukovsky and a companion Play For Today follow-up entitled Nina (1978), which starred Jack Shepherd and Eleanor Bron.

A number of his works achieved notoriety and widespread criticism from the conservative end of the political spectrum, including Scum (1977), dealing with the subject of borstals (youth prisons), which was banned by the BBC, and subsequently remade by Clarke as a feature film released in 1979 (the original television version was only screened after his death). Clarke directed the television play Made in Britain (1982), starring Tim Roth (in his television debut) as a racist skinhead and his negative relationship with authorities and racial minorities, from a screenplay by David Leland. The feature film Rita, Sue and Bob Too (1987), was adapted by the working class writer Andrea Dunbar from her stage work. The 1975 BBC play Diane, starring Janine Duvitski, which dealt with an incestuous relationship between a father and daughter was controversially received by the tabloid press.

Clarke's work in the 1980s was fiercely stark and political, including the David Leland plays Beloved Enemy (1981) on multinational corporations and Psy-Warriors (1981) on military interrogation. Clarke also directed David Bowie in Baal (1982) for the BBC, part of Clarke's interest in Bertolt Brecht. His film work became more sparse, culminating in Contact (1985) on the British military presence in Northern Ireland, Billy the Kid and the Green Baize Vampire (1985), Road (1987), and Elephant (1989).

Many of the films that Clarke directed from this period are often seen as bleak and lacking redemptive qualities – the 1986 BBC film Christine dealt with teenage drug addiction whilst Road featured a cast of characters in the depressed estates of Northern England. Elephant, lasting only 37 minutes, dealt with 'the troubles' in Northern Ireland by featuring a series of shootings with no narrative and minimal dialogue; all were based on accounts of actual sectarian killings that had taken place in Belfast. The film took its title from Bernard MacLaverty's description of the troubles as "the elephant in our living room" – a reference to the collective denial of the underlying social problems of Northern Ireland. His final production of Al Hunter's The Firm (1989), covered football hooliganism through the lead character played by Gary Oldman, but also explored the politics of Thatcher's Britain. Like several of Clarke's previous films, the screening of The Firm as part of BBC 2's Screen Two series was controversial and criticised by some of the British Press as being too violent and sexually explicit. Like Christine, Road and Elephant, The Firm was also notable for Clarke's use of the steadicam, partly inspired by its earlier use in films by Stanley Kubrick like The Shining.

In 1990, Clarke travelled to America in order to pursue the idea of developing a US-based career in filmmaking. Prior to his death, he was making initial plans to film Assassination On Embassy Row, later retitled An American Murder, about a murder filmed from the assassin's point-of-view. The film never came to fruition partly due to a lack of interest from the major US film studios and Clarke's declining health. Another project, a script by David Yallop entitled In God's Name also went unmade as Clarke began radiotherapy for cancer which by that time had spread from his lungs to his spine.

In 1991 a documentary on him Director Alan Clarke by Corin Campbell-Hill aired on British TV. In 2016, all of Clarke's surviving work for the BBC was released in a 2-part DVD/Blu-Ray collection titled Dissent & Disruption: Alan Clarke at the BBC. This set included the first official release of the 1976 documentary Bukovsky alongside interviews with many of Clarke's collaborators and contemporaries.

Clarke has inspired others, such as the director Nick Love, to direct films founded upon social realism. Love stated that it was watching Clarke's The Firm that motivated him to become a film maker.

Personal life

Clarke died on 24 July 1990 after suffering from lung cancer. He was 54.

Clarke's son is Gabriel Clarke, a sports journalist with ITV. His daughter is Molly Clarke.

Filmography

Feature films
Scum (1979)
Billy the Kid and the Green Baize Vampire (1987)
Rita, Sue and Bob Too (1987)
The Firm (1989)

Television plays 
Penda's Fen (1974)
Made in Britain (1982)

Cultural influences
Musician Annie Locke was a close friend of Clarke for many years, and they worked together on The Love-Girl and the Innocent. After Clarke's death, she wrote a suite of pieces in his memory, entitled "A Man Called Alan".

Clarke inspired a generation of actors, writers and directors, including Paul Greengrass, Stephen Frears, Tim Roth, Ray Winstone, Gary Oldman, Danny Brocklehurst and Iain MacDonald. Filmmakers Harmony Korine and Joel Potrykus have cited Clarke as a major influence on their work. As documented in the series  The Story of Film  by Mark Cousins, the 2003 movie Elephant by Gus Van Sant about the Columbine High School Massacre was named after and influenced by Clarke's earlier work of the same title, especially by Clarke's penchant for long take tracking shots, often following one or more characters from the rear as they move through space. Critic David Thomson has observed, "No one has ever grasped the central metaphor of cramped existence in walking as well as Alan Clarke."

References

Further reading
Alan Clarke, Richard Kelly (editor), London: Faber, 1998
Alan Clarke, Dave Rolinson, Manchester: Manchester University Press, 2005
Andrea Grunert, "Alan Clarke: Die unglaubliche Energie der Rechtlosen"; in: Lexikon des Kinder- und Jugendfilms im Kino, im Fernsehen und auf Video, Meitingen: Corian, November 2003 (p. 1–7)

External links
Biography and filmography from the British Film Institute's Screenonline

Senses of Cinema profile
Village Voice article (09/2004)
"The Hallelujah Handshake" from "Play for Today website"
My Hero Alan Clarke Paul Greengrass tells of his unexpected encounter with Clarke at a court martial
 Alan Clarke: His Own Man (https://www.youtube.com/watch?v=tXzAeji4CPU) a 2000 documentary made for Film4 by Andy Kimpton-Nye/400Blows Productions.
 Tim Roth: Made in Britain (https://www.youtube.com/watch?v=deOzrwyMqRA) a 2000 documentary short made for Film4: Tim Roth talks about working with Alan Clarke. Made by Andy Kimpton-Nye/400Blows Productions.
 Memories of: Elephant (https://www.youtube.com/watch?v=Lyj0DNoeCSg) a 2000 documentary short made for Film4: Gary Oldman, David Hare, Howard Schuman and Molly Clarke remember Alan Clarke's powerful BBC drama, Elephant. made by Andy Kimpton-Nye/400Blows Productions.

1935 births
1990 deaths
English film directors
English television directors
ITV people
British experimental filmmakers
People from Birkenhead
Social realism
Deaths from cancer in England
People from Cheshire